Choi Won-Kwon (born 8 November 1981) is a South Korean former football player who currently works as a caretaker manager for Daegu FC.

Club career
He was played for FC Seoul, Jeju United, Daegu FC

International career 
He was part of the South Korea U-23 team in the 2004 Summer Olympics that finished second in Group A, making it through to the next round before being defeated by the eventual silver medalists, Paraguay.

Career statistics 

※ Checking 7 matches in 2001–02 Asian Club Championship now.

See also
South Korea national football team

External links
 
 National Team Player Record 
 FIFA Player Statistics
 

1981 births
Living people
Association football defenders
South Korean footballers
South Korea international footballers
FC Seoul players
Gimcheon Sangmu FC players
Jeju United FC players
Daegu FC players
K League 1 players
K League 2 players
Korea National League players
Footballers at the 2004 Summer Olympics
Olympic footballers of South Korea
Footballers from Seoul